Shelby Cotton Mill is an historical textile mill located in Shelby, North Carolina. Built in 1900, it is listed on the National Register of Historic Places.

History 

The mill was opened in April 1900. And by 1901, the mill was expanded with 8,784 ring spindles, 250 broad looms, and 14 carding machines. By 1920s, it became Cleveland County's largest textile mill manufacturing yam and "pajama check".

References 

Houses on the National Register of Historic Places in North Carolina
National Register of Historic Places in Cleveland County, North Carolina